Tirame de la Lengua (Make Me Speak or, literally, Pull Me From the Tongue) is a TV gameshow broadcast on Televisión Española (TVE) and TVE Internacional. The teams are the Lenguetazos and Lenguetones. Children between 9 and 12 years old participate, and slide down an enormous tongue to enter the set. During the half hour show, the contestants play games like Letter Soup and Trabalenguas (tongue twisters) with a lollipop in their mouths. An animated Miguel de Cervantes judges the results of the teams.

The host is Ana Belen Roy, a journalist from Madrid who joined Televisión Española in 1997, where she has worked as an announcer and a reporter.

References

RTVE shows
Spanish children's television series
Spanish game shows